Ilmen-Suvorovsky is a rural locality (a khutor) and the administrative center of Ilmenskoye Rural Settlement, Oktyabrsky District, Volgograd Oblast, Russia. The population was 787 as of 2010. There are 10 streets.

Geography 
Ilmen-Suvorovsky is located in steppe, on the east bank of the Tsimlyansk Reservoir, 70 km northwest of Oktyabrsky (the district's administrative centre) by road. Molokanovsky is the nearest rural locality.

References 

Rural localities in Oktyabrsky District, Volgograd Oblast